Inlow Hall, the administration building at Eastern Oregon University in La Grande, Oregon, United States, was built in 1929.  It was listed on the National Register of Historic Places as the Administration Building in 1980.

It was built originally as the Eastern Oregon State Normal School.  The building "is a modern adaptation of Italian Renaissance palatial architecture and includes a formal grand stair with overlook terrace. Originally,... it housed all functions appropriate to a teacher training institution until a separate unit, J. H. Ackerman Laboratory School, was added to the campus in 1935."

See also
National Register of Historic Places listings in Union County, Oregon

References

External links

1929 establishments in Oregon
Buildings and structures in Union County, Oregon
Eastern Oregon University
National Register of Historic Places in Union County, Oregon
Renaissance Revival architecture in Oregon
School buildings completed in 1929
University and college administration buildings in the United States
University and college buildings on the National Register of Historic Places in Oregon